The 2010–11 season are the Sepahan Football Club's 10th season in the Iran Pro League, and their 18th consecutive season in the top division of Iranian football which they won their 3rd title in this season. They also competed in the Hazfi Cup but were eliminated by Persepolis in the Quarter-Final and are also competing in AFC Champions League.

Player

First team squad

Iran Pro League squad

On loan

For recent transfers, see List of Iranian football transfers winter 2010–11''.

Transfers

Summer 2010

Winter 2010-11

Competitions

Iran Pro League

Standings

AFC Champions League 2011

Hazfi Cup

Coaching staff

Other information

See also
2010–11 Persian Gulf Cup
2010–11 Hazfi Cup
2011 AFC Champions League

References

External links
Iran Premier League Statistics
Persian League

2010-11
Iranian football clubs 2010–11 season